Big Night Music is the fifth full-length Shriekback studio album, released in 1986. It spent six weeks on the Billboard album chart, peaking at number 145. With the departure of Carl Marsh, Barry Andrews takes over as the band's frontman.  Remaining original member Dave Allen left the band following this release.

Track listing
All songs by Dave Allen, Barry Andrews and Martyn Barker. 
"Black Light Trap" - 5:09
"Gunning for the Buddha" - 4:37
"Running on the Rocks" - 4:58
"The Shining Path" - 4:37
"Pretty Little Things" - 3:50
"Underwaterboys" - 4:51
"Exquisite" - 4:30
"The Reptiles and I" - 4:32
"Sticky Jazz" - 4:28
"Cradle Song" - 4:16

Charts

Personnel
Barry Andrews - keyboards, synthesizers, lead vocals
Dave Allen - bass
Martyn Barker - drums
 Sarah Partridge - backing vocals (tracks 1, 3 to 7 and 9)
 Wendy Partridge - backing vocals (tracks 1, 3 to 7 and 9)
 Steve Halliwell - keyboards, Hammond organ and electric piano (tracks 1, 4 to 6, 9 and 10)
 Mike Cozzi - guitar and acoustic guitar (tracks 1 to 4 and 6 to 10)
 Mark Chandler - trumpet (tracks 1 and 3)
 Ian Fraser - tenor saxophone (tracks 1 and 3)
 Richard Edwards - trombone (tracks 1 and 3)

References

External links
Big Night Music lyrics
Big Night Music on Band's website

1986 albums
Shriekback albums
Island Records albums